Mikhaíl Nikoláyevich Mikhéyev (28 October 1905 – 27 August 1989) — was a Soviet physicist, physics of metals expert, corresponding member of RAS (since 1979).

Biography

Mikhaíl Nikoláyevich Mikhéyev was born 28 October 1905 at Zuyevka Station, now part of Kirov Oblast. He graduated from Leningrad State University in 1930. Then he worked at Ioffe Institute (1928 - 1932), Ural Institute of Physics and Technology (now the Physics of Metals Institute of Ural Division of the Russian Academy of Sciences) as a director from 1932 until 1948, and from 1953 until 1986. He was also a member of the Sverdlovsk Oblast Council (1963 — 1971).

Mikhéyev died in 1989, at the age of 83. He was buried at Sverdlovsk. In 2014 the Physics of Metals Institute of Ural Division of the Russian Academy of Sciences was renamed to Physics of Metals Institute of Ural Division of the Russian Academy of Sciences.

Scientific effort

Authority on magnetism, ferromagnetism, magnetic structure analysis, magnetic flaw detection etc.

Author of more than 200 scientific publications, including more than 20 monographs and 11 authors certificates, like:
 Магнитные методы структурного анализа и неразрушающего контроля. (Magnetic methods of structure analysis and nondestructive inspection) — M., 1992

Awards
 Order of Lenin (1983)
 Order of the October Revolution (1971)
 Order of the Red Banner of Labour (1975)
 Order of the Badge of Honour (1945, 1954)
 Medal "For Valiant Labour in the Great Patriotic War 1941–1945" (1945)
 USSR State Prize (1951) — for development and integration into industry new methods of quality control of the steelworks

References

External links
 Михеев Михаил Николаевич // Ural Historical Encyclopedia
 Articles in UFN
 Михаил Николаевич Михеев

1905 births
1989 deaths
Soviet physicists
Scientists from Yekaterinburg